Hornet is an identity used by five fictional characters appearing in American comic books published by Marvel Comics. The characters appear in the Marvel Universe, two villains, and three heroes. Both the first and third versions have suffered from physical disabilities.

Publication history
Although the armor of the third Hornet first appeared in Spider-Man as one of the four new superheroes Peter Parker had taken on, this version first appeared in Slingers #0 and was created by Joseph Harris, Todd DeZago, and Mike Wieringo. Speculation that the deceased Hornet in Wolverine vol. 3 #23 was not Eddie, but instead someone else who took on the name and costume, has been disproven by The Loners writer C. B. Cebulski, and The Loners #2 states that Hornet was indeed killed by Wolverine.

Fictional character biography

Scotty McDowell

Scotty McDowell was a wheelchair-using criminologist who assisted Spider-Woman's cases. He was kidnapped by the mad scientist Karl Malus who injected Scotty with a formula composed of human and insect DNA, as well as several kinds of medicine. Spider-Woman rescued Scotty who seemed fine.

Scotty began to suffer from nightmares in which he killed Spider-Woman. He awoke to discover that he had great strength and insect-like wings that allowed him to fly (but still unable to walk). He then received a costume in the mail (sent by Malus), and when he put it on, had a personality shift, becoming aggressive and chauvinistic. He flew around as the Hornet, and started out as a hero, saving people, and working with Spider-Woman. He even learned that he could throw bursts of bio-electricity.

But Hornet became more and more resentful of Spider-Woman, and began to endanger the innocents he was "helping", even striking an onlooker with one of his electric blasts. When he nearly killed some thieves, Spider-Woman was sent after him. However, Hornet's abilities were almost a match for Spider-Woman, and unlike Spider-Woman, he wasn't trying to hold back for fear of hurting his friend. After a prolonged battle, Spider-Woman was able to subdue Hornet who was nearly homicidal by this point. Spider-Woman learned that Malus had altered Scotty into Hornet, for the sole purpose of having Spider-Woman die at the hands of a friend. Spider-Woman was able to flush the formula from Scotty's bloodstream, and revert him to normal (stripping him of both his powers and aggression).

Afterwards, Spider-Woman learned that although the formula did make him more aggressive, the resentment he felt was real. Scotty admitted he was in love, but felt that Spider-Woman didn't notice him. He was also jealous of the attention garnered with the woman's heroic deeds. This put a strain on their friendship, and Spider-Woman ended their "working relationship". McDowell accepted this as well, taking a job farther away so as to preserve what was left of their friendship.

Peter Parker

When Spider-Man was accused of murder during the Identity Crisis storyline, Peter Parker donned four different costumes to continue saving lives without anyone knowing it was him; one of the adopted identities was Hornet. The Hornet costume was designed by Mary Jane Watson-Parker and the weapon gauntlets were designed by Spider-Man based on Ben Reilly's stinger launching pod built within the web-shooters.  The cybernetically-controlled wing harness was designed by Hobie Brown who never used the device due to being too heavy to be worn by a person of normal strength. Peter, however, was easily able to wear the equipment.

Peter used the Hornet identity with great success for several days, being a popular hero with the media after his debut featured him thwarting the Looter's attempt to rob the Daily Bugle. But the Vulture realized that "Hornet" was actually Spider-Man after recognising his characteristic banter and exposed him. Parker abandoned the Hornet persona, and soon after cleared his name.

Although the hero Black Marvel later gave a duplicate Hornet costume to Eddie McDonough, the original costume remained in Peter's possession, except for the flight harness which was returned to Hobie.

Eddie McDonough

Eddie McDonough was a science whiz who compensated for his palsied right arm with a knack for inventing. He was given the Hornet costume by the Black Marvel, and joined the Slingers. Eddie was able to modify the harness, making the equipment light enough to wear. He also added additional weaponry, and made the costume more like a suit of armor (and even enabled the costume to enhance his strength). As the new Hornet, Eddie was more confident than he was normally. With the suit enhancing his strength, nobody (but his teammate Dusk) noticed that his right arm was normally weaker and atrophied. Hornet fought mutant rats, gangsters, and demons with his powers. Hornet also had to fight team leader Prodigy to save his friend Ricochet and even the  villains they were fighting from the superhumanly strong "hero". Hornet also tried to win the affections of his teammate Dusk, but Dusk was more attracted to the energetic Ricochet.

Hornet learned that the Black Marvel had made a deal with the demon Mephisto, to have restored powers and youth and train new heroes (the Slingers), and when Mephisto collected the Black Marvel's soul, Mephisto took the Slingers too and sent the team to Hell. He offered them the chance to leave, if they abandoned Black Marvel. While the other Slingers wanted to leave Black Marvel to this fate, Hornet was able to forgive the old man, and convinced the others to help free Black Marvel. Black Marvel died in the attempt, but Hornet's act of forgiveness enabled Black Marvel's soul to ascend to a better place. In doing so, Hornet's armor and Prodigy's powers were surrendered and lost. The team disbanded and the depowered Hornet and Prodigy apparently retired from superheroics.

At some point, Johnny and Eddie returned to fighting crime together under their old identities. Hornet ended up going alone against HYDRA and Wolverine being mind-controlled as they attacked Stark International and was killed. Nick Fury, Elektra, and other S.H.I.E.L.D. agents later found his corpse at the scene. S.H.I.E.L.D. agents somehow initially mistook Hornet's body for Spider-Man's, Fury musing grimly on the tragedy of the man dying a hero when nobody could even remember his name. Elektra then cut off the corpse's head to prevent the Hand from resurrecting him.

Years after his death, his teenage niece Melinda McDonough takes on the identity Red Hornet. As a child, her parents (Eddie's older brother and sister-in-law) thought Melinda was developmentally delayed but her uncle knew Melinda was in fact exceptionally smart and encouraged a love of science.

Silas Burr

Following Hydra's takeover of America, a man in Eddie's Hornet costume appears in Las Vegas, hired by the Forbidden City casino owner Silas Thorne to stage a robbery of a mass food delivery being sent to another casino, as Thorne claims that casino owner Cassandra Mercury will simply take all of the food for herself and her employees rather than pass it around. The Hornet is able to defeat most of casino security before he is intercepted by Scarlet Spider. Hornet declines to answer questions about his apparent resurrection and flees. When Scarlet Spider and Ricochet track Hornet to the Forbidden City casino, where Thorne works, the Hornet uses a strange amulet to summon an army of monsters, subsequently introducing himself as "Silas" to Ricochet during the fight. After Scarlet Spider damages the amulet, the monsters are contained by Dusk, but Hornet flees in the resulting confusion. He brings the rest of the Slingers together, claiming that he has been chosen by the Black Marvel, and the team are ordered to capture Scarlet Spider to charge him for his attack on Thorne. As the two Scarlet Spiders confront the Slingers, it is revealed that the Black Marvel has no soul and this Hornet is actually Cyber who was brought back to life by an as-yet-unidentified entity that was posing as Black Marvel.

Hobie Brown

During the King in Black storyline, Hobie Brown is shown to have taken up the alias of Hornet himself during the Symbiote invasion.

Powers and abilities
Scotty McDowell was superhumanly strong and had insect-like wings on his back that allowed him to fly at high-speeds. His "Hornet Sting" could project focused bursts of bio-electricity that could stun or kill a person.

In addition to Peter Parker's regular abilities, the Hornet costume gave Peter the ability to fly and shoot fast-acting sedative stinger darts.

Eddie McDonough's Hornet costume had a jet-powered wing harness that enabled Eddie to fly at high speeds. Micro-servos in the armored suit enhanced his strength to superhuman levels. His gauntlets contained wrist blasters that could fire darts filled with a fast-acting sedative, or powerful laser-beams.

Silas Burr retains his predecessor's costume, which includes a jet-powered wing harness that enabled high-speed flight, enhanced strength through micro-servos in the armored suit, and wrist blasters in the gauntlets that could fire darts filled with a fast-acting sedative, or powerful laser-beams. He has also been shown using an amulet that allows him to summon a twisted demon creature, but it is unclear if he can do this on a regular basis after the amulet that allowed him to summon the creature was destroyed.

In other media

Video games
 Hornet appears as a downloadable costume in Spider-Man: Edge of Time.
 Hornet appears as an additional costume in The Amazing Spider-Man 2.
 Hornet appears as a playable character in Spider-Man Unlimited.

References

External links
Hornet on the Marvel Univerese Character Bio Wiki

Comics characters introduced in 1998
Marvel Comics characters with superhuman strength
Marvel Comics scientists
Marvel Comics superheroes
Articles about multiple fictional characters